Prapart Kobkaew (born October 6, 1984), is a professional footballer from Thailand.

Club career

Honours

Club
Thailand Tobacco Monopoly 
 Thai Premier League Champions (1) : 2004-05

External links
 Profile at Goal
 

1984 births
Living people
Prapart Kobkaew
Prapart Kobkaew
Association football goalkeepers
Prapart Kobkaew
Prapart Kobkaew
Prapart Kobkaew
Prapart Kobkaew
Prapart Kobkaew
Prapart Kobkaew
Prapart Kobkaew
Prapart Kobkaew